Traditional boat race at the 2011 Southeast Asian Games was held at Lake Cipule, Karawang, Indonesia.

Medal summary

Men

Women

Medal table

External links
  2011 Southeast Asian Games

2011 Southeast Asian Games events